Pedro is an unincorporated community in Benton County, Arkansas, United States.

Pedro is close to the confluence of the Osage Creek and the  Illinois River.

Illinois River Bridge
Pedro is the location of (or is the nearest community to) Illinois River Bridge, which is located on County Road 196 (Kincheloe Rd.) approx. 0.25 mi. S of old AR 68 and is listed on the National Register of Historic Places.

References

Unincorporated communities in Benton County, Arkansas
Unincorporated communities in Arkansas